Ole Myrvoll (18 May 1911 –  16 July 1988) was a Norwegian professor in economy and politician for the Liberal Party and later the New People's Party.

He was born in Kragerø.

He served as a deputy representative to the Norwegian Parliament from Bergen during the terms 1965–1969 and 1969–1973. From August to September 1963 he was Minister of Wages and Prices during the short-lived centre-right cabinet Lyng. He became Minister of Finance from 1965 to 1971 during the cabinet Borten. In December 1972, Myrvoll joined the New People's Party which split from the Liberal Party over disagreements of Norway's proposed entry to the European Economic Community. He was elected to Norwegian Parliament for this party in 1973, this time from Hordaland as Bergen had ceased to be a county and as such constituency.

On the local level Myrvoll was a member of the executive committee of Bergen city council from 1947 to 1955 and 1974 to 1975. He served as mayor from 1972 to 1973.

An economist by profession, he graduated with a cand.oecon. degree in 1935, and with an MA degree from the University of Virginia in 1937. He was hired as a research fellow at the Norwegian School of Economics and Business Administration in 1942, and was given the professorate following his doctorate degree in 1957 at the same school.

References

1911 births
1988 deaths
Members of the Storting
Government ministers of Norway
Liberal Party (Norway) politicians
Liberal People's Party (Norway, 1972) politicians
Mayors of Bergen
University of Virginia alumni
Academic staff of the Norwegian School of Economics
Ministers of Finance of Norway
20th-century  Norwegian economists
20th-century Norwegian politicians
People from Kragerø